The Shenzhen Masters is an annual chess tournament held in the Longgang District of Shenzhen, Guangdong province, China. In 2021 due to the ongoing COVID-19 pandemic an online edition was held on chess.com.

Winners

Event crosstables

2017
{| class="wikitable" style="text-align: center;"
|+ 1st Du Te Cup, 23 March – 1 April 2017, Shenzhen, China, Category XXI (2756)
! !! Player !! Rating !! 1 !! 2 !! 3 !! 4 !! 5 !! 6 !! Points !!  !! SB !! TPR
|-
|-style="background:#ccffcc;"
| 1 || align=left| || 2759 ||  || ½ ½ || 1 ½ || ½ 1 || ½ 1 || ½ ½ ||6½ || || || 2865
|-
| 2 || align=left| || 2769 || ½ ½ ||  || ½ ½ || ½ ½ || 1 ½ || ½ ½ ||5½ || 1 || 26.75 || 2789
|-
| 3 || align=left| || 2741 || 0 ½ || ½ ½ ||  || ½ ½ || ½ 1 || ½ 1 ||5½ || 1 || 25.25 || 2795
|-
| 4 || align=left| || 2750 || ½ 0 || ½ ½ || ½ ½ ||  || ½ ½ || ½ ½ ||4½ || 1 || 22.25 || 2721
|-
| 5 || align=left| || 2758 || ½ 0 || 0 ½ || ½ 0 || ½ ½ ||  || 1 1 ||4½ || 1 || 20.25 || 2720
|-
| 6 || align=left| || 2761 || ½ ½ || ½ ½ || ½ 0 || ½ ½ || 0 0 ||  ||3½ || || || 2645
|}

2018
{| class="wikitable" style="text-align: center;"
|+ 2nd Du Te Cup, 4–13 November 2018, Shenzhen, China, Category XXI (2766)
! !! Player !! Rating !! 1 !! 2 !! 3 !! 4 !! 5 !! 6 !! Points !! TPR
|-
|-style="background:#ccffcc;"
| 1 || align=left| || 2778 ||  || ½ ½ || ½ 1 || ½ ½ || ½ ½ || ½ ½ ||5½ || 2799
|-
| 2 || align=left| || 2780 || ½ ½ ||  || ½ ½ || ½ ½ || ½ ½ || ½ 1 ||5½ || 2799
|-
| 3 || align=left| || 2816 || ½ 0 || ½ ½ ||  || ½ 1 || ½ ½ || 1 ½ ||5½ || 2792
|-
| 4 || align=left| || 2764 || ½ ½ || ½ ½ || ½ 0 ||  || 1 ½ || ½ ½ ||5 || 2766
|-
| 5 || align=left| || 2709 || ½ ½ || ½ ½ || ½ ½ || 0 ½ ||  || ½ 1 ||5 || 2777
|-
| 6 || align=left| || 2749 || ½ ½ || ½ 0 || 0 ½ || ½ ½ || ½ 0 ||  ||3½ || 2659
|}

2019
{| class="wikitable" style="text-align: center;"
|+ 3rd Du Te Cup, 17–26 April 2019, Shenzhen, China, Category XXI (2754)
! !! Player !! Rating !! 1 !! 2 !! 3 !! 4 !! 5 !! 6 !! Points !!  !! SB !! TPR
|-
|-style="background:#ccffcc;"
| 1 || align=left| || 2797 ||  || 1 ½ || ½ ½ || ½ ½ || ½ 1 || ½ 1 ||6½ || || || 2856
|-
| 2 || align=left| || 2723 || 0 ½ ||  || 1 0 || 1 0 || ½ 1 || 1 1 ||6 || || || 2832
|-
| 3 || align=left| || 2809 || ½ ½ || 0 1 ||  || ½ ½ || 1 ½ || ½ ½ ||5½ || || || 2779
|-
| 4 || align=left| || 2726 || ½ ½ || 0 1 || ½ ½ ||  || ½ ½ || ½ ½ ||5 || || || 2760
|-
| 5 || align=left| || 2719 || ½ 0 || ½ 0 || 0 ½ || ½ ½ ||  || ½ ½ ||3½ || 1 || 17.50 || 2651
|-
| 6 || align=left| || 2751 || ½ 0 || 0 0 || ½ ½ || ½ ½ || ½ ½ ||  ||3½ || 1 || 17.25 || 2645
|}

See also
 List of strong chess tournaments

References
Notes

External links

Chess competitions
Chess in China
International sports competitions hosted by China
Sport in Shenzhen
Recurring sporting events established in 2017
Sports competitions in Guangdong